The 2002–03 Cypriot First Division was the 64th season of the Cypriot top-level football league. Omonia won their 19th title.

Format
Fourteen teams participated in the 2002–03 Cypriot First Division. All teams played against each other twice, once at their home and once away. The team with the most points at the end of the season crowned champions. The last three teams were relegated to the 2003–04 Cypriot Second Division.

The champions ensured their participation in the 2003–04 UEFA Champions League and the runners-up in the 2003–04 UEFA Cup.

The teams had to declare their interest to participate in the 2003 UEFA Intertoto Cup before the end of the championship. At the end of the championship, the higher placed teams among the interested ones participated in the Intertoto Cup (if they had not secured their participation in any other UEFA competition).

Point system
Teams received three points for a win, one point for a draw and zero points for a loss.

Changes from previous season
Ethnikos Assia, Doxa Katokopias and Ermis Aradippou were relegated from previous season and played in the 2002–03 Cypriot Second Division. They were replaced by the first three teams of the 2001–02 Cypriot Second Division, Nea Salamina, Digenis Morphou and Aris Limassol.

Stadia and locations

League standings

Results

See also
 Cypriot First Division
 2002–03 Cypriot Cup
 List of top goalscorers in Cypriot First Division by season
 Cypriot football clubs in European competitions

References

Sources

1. DIVISION 2002/2003

Cypriot First Division seasons
Cyprus
2002–03 in Cypriot football